Kristin Sandberg (born 23 March 1972) is a former Norwegian football player and World Champion.

She played on the Norwegian team that won the 1995 FIFA Women's World Cup.

References

1972 births
Living people
Norwegian women's footballers
Norway women's international footballers
1995 FIFA Women's World Cup players
FIFA Women's World Cup-winning players
Toppserien players
Asker Fotball (women) players
UEFA Women's Championship-winning players
Women's association footballers not categorized by position